Arthur Knight (26 January 1906 – 26 April 1990) was a New Zealand rugby union player. A loose forward, Knight represented Auckland at a provincial level, and was a member of the New Zealand national side, the All Blacks, between 1926 and 1934. He played 14 matches for the All Blacks including one international.

References

1906 births
1990 deaths
Rugby union players from Auckland
New Zealand rugby union players
New Zealand international rugby union players
Auckland rugby union players
Rugby union flankers